This is a list of seasons played by Catalans Dragons. It covers the period from the club's inaugural season in the Super League in 2006, to the current 2020 season. It also covers their inaugural five seasons in the French Rugby League Championship as Union Treiziste Catalane. It details the club's achievements in all major competitions and the top try and points scorers for each season.

Seasons

Key

Key to league record:
P = Played
W = Games won
D = Games drawn
L = Games lost
F = Points for
A = Points against
Pts = League points
Pos = Final league position

Key to rounds:
R4 = Round 4
R5 = Round 5
QF = Quarter-finals
SF = Semi-finals
RU = Runners-up
W = Winners

Footnotes

References
Catalans Dragons - Seasons at Rugby League Project
Catalan (sic) Dragons at Love Rugby League

Seasons
Catalans